Tours Métropole Val de Loire is the métropole, an intercommunal structure, centred on the city of Tours. It is located in the Indre-et-Loire department, in the Centre-Val de Loire region, central France. It was created in March 2017, replacing the previous Communauté urbaine Tour(S) Plus. Its area is 389.2 km2. Its population was 294,220 in 2018, of which 136,463 in Tours proper.

Composition
Tours Métropole Val de Loire consists of the following 22 communes:

Ballan-Miré
Berthenay
Chambray-lès-Tours
Chanceaux-sur-Choisille
Druye
Fondettes
Joué-lès-Tours
Luynes
La Membrolle-sur-Choisille
Mettray
Notre-Dame-d'Oé
Parçay-Meslay
La Riche
Rochecorbon
Saint-Avertin
Saint-Cyr-sur-Loire
Saint-Étienne-de-Chigny
Saint-Genouph
Saint-Pierre-des-Corps
Savonnières
Tours
Villandry

References

Tours
Tours, France
Tours